Devata is a 1941 Indian Telugu-language drama film directed by B. N. Reddy. The huge success of this film led to the making of more films with the same title in 1964 by B. Padmanabham and in 1982 by D. Ramanaidu. The film was remade in Malayalam as Pavappettaval (1967).

Plot 

Venugopala Murthy returns to his native village from England after passing law school. His mother Mangamma and sister Seetha are very happy. Venu is attracted towards Lakshmi, daughter of Venkaiah, who works as servant in the family. He takes advantage of the sleeping Lakshmi and promises to marry her. He leaves to the city and stays with his uncle Balaramaiah. Venu marries his daughter Vimala. Mangamma and Seetha bring the pregnant Lakshmi to the city. Venu refuses to accept her and offers some money to Lakshmi. She leaves the house when her father arranges for the marriage. She take refuge with the Haridasu family and delivers a child. Meanwhile, Vimala elopes with Sukumar. Mangamma sends Venu to bring back Lakshmi. After several hardships, Lakshmi reunites with Venu.

Cast 
 V. Nagayya  as Venugopala Murthy
 Kumari  as Lakshmi, daughter of Venkaiah
 Mudigonda Lingamurthy as Venkaiah
 Bezawada Rajarathnam as Vimala, daughter of Balaramiah
 Goberu Subba Rao as Balaramaiah, uncle of Venu
 C. H. Narayana Rao as Sukumar
 Tanguturi Suryakumari as Seeta, sister of Venu
 Master Ashwathama as Rangadu
 Parvathi Bai as Mangamma, mother of Venu
 R. Satyanarayana

Soundtrack 
There are about 14 songs in the film. The lyrics are written by Samudrala Sr. and music score is provided by V. Nagayya.
 "Adigo Andiyala Ravali" – Bezawada Rajaratnam
 "Bhajane Modajanakamura" – G. Vishweswaramma and Suryakumari
 "Ee Vasanthamu Nityamu Kadoyi" – M. S. Rama Rao
 "Enno Nomulu Nochinagani" – G. Vishweswaramma
 "Evaru Makinka Saati" – Bezawada Rajaratnam
 "Jagela Verapela Travumu" – Bezawada Rajaratnam
 "Kroora Karmamulu Neraka Chesiti" – G. Vishweswaramma and Suryakumari
 "Lokamantha Lobhule Kanare" – Ashwathama
 "Nijamo Kado Yamuna Thatilo" – Bezawada Rajaratnam
 "Oogeda Uyyala" – Tanguturi Suryakumari
 "Rade Cheli Nammarade Cheli" – Bezawada Rajaratnam
 "Raitu Janamula Panduga" – Tanguturi Suryakumari group
 "Rave Rave Bangaru Papa" – Nagayya, Kumari, Suryakumari
 "Vendi Kanchalalo" – Tanguturi Suryakumari

Reception 
Ananda Vikatan wrote, "Oh gods and goddesses! We wanted to portray you as heroes and heroines in our films. That's what we said when we produced talkies. No god/goddess objected to that. [T]hen we came down to Puranic characters – on to bhaktas, maharajahs, zamindars, millionaires and thence to the common man. But none had thought to make the servant maid the heroine of a film". B. Vijayakumar of The Hindu wrote, "Even if the story is simple and artistic, technical brilliance can bring unusual success for a film. B. N. Reddy’s black and white classic Telugu film Devata is a best example for this."

References

Bibliography

External links 
 

1940s Telugu-language films
1941 drama films
1941 films
Films directed by B. N. Reddy
Indian black-and-white films
Indian drama films
Telugu films remade in other languages
Films scored by Nagayya